Aphyocharacidium is a genus of characin found in tropical South America, with two currently described species:
Aphyocharacidium bolivianum Géry, 1973
Aphyocharacidium melandetum (C. H. Eigenmann, 1912)

References
 

Characidae
Taxa named by Jacques Géry
Fish of South America
Tropical fish